Employment testing is the practice of administering written, oral, or other tests as a means of determining the suitability or desirability of a job applicant.  The premise is that if scores on a test correlate with job performance, then it is economically useful for the employer to select employees based on scores from that test.

Legal context (United States) 

The United States Supreme Court has decided several cases clarifying the place of employment testing in the context of discrimination law. In particular, these cases have addressed the discriminatory use of tests when promoting employees by requiring tests beyond the education required for the job. A central finding in Griggs v. Duke Power Co. was that the employer must demonstrate (or be prepared to demonstrate) that its selection process is related to the job being filled.

Test types used 

Different types of assessments may be used for employment testing, including personality tests, intelligence tests, work samples, and assessment centers. Some correlate better with job performance than with others; employers often use more than one to maximize predictive power.

Performance assessment tests 
Performance-based assessment testing is a process to find out if applicants can do the job for which they are applying. It is done through tests, which are directly administered and judged by Hiring Managers who will be supervising the potential hire. 

The tests are peer-to-peer and reflect real business tasks that candidates have to perform, should they be selected for the role. The tests are open ended, time bound, business related questions which applicants need to submit their responses for in order to prove their abilities.

Personality tests 
Personality tests may potentially be useful in personnel selection. Of the well-known Big Five personality traits, only conscientiousness correlates substantially with traditional measures of job performance, and that correlation is strong enough to be predictive.  However, other factors of personality can correlate substantially with non-traditional aspects of job performance, such as leadership and effectiveness in a team environment.  The Myers-Briggs Type Indicator (MBTI) is also used.

The Minnesota Multiphasic Personality Inventory (MMPI) is a highly validated psychopathology test that is generally used in a clinical psychology setting and may reveal potential mental health disorders. However, this can be considered by the Equal Employment Opportunity Commission as the employer having knowledge of a medical condition prior to an offer of employment. This is an illegal basis for a hiring decision in the United States. Employers considering personality tests should focus on tests designed for job purposes and do not provide any information regarding an applicant's mental health or stability.

Notable situations in which the MMPI may be used are in final selection for police officers, fire fighters, and other security and emergency personnel, especially when the employees are required to carry weapons. An assessment of mental stability and fitness can be reasonably related and necessary in the performance of the job.

Employment integrity testing is used to determine an applicant's honesty and integrity.

Cognitive ability tests 

Tests of cognitive ability can assess general intelligence and correlate very highly with overall job performance.  Individuals with higher levels of cognitive ability tend to perform better on their jobs. This is especially true for jobs that are particularly intellectually demanding.

Job-knowledge tests 

Employers administer job-knowledge tests when applicants must already possess a body of knowledge before being hired. Job-knowledge tests are particularly useful when applicants must have specialized or technical knowledge that can only be acquired through extensive experience or training. Job-knowledge tests are commonly used in fields such as computer programming, law, financial management, and electrical or mechanical maintenance.

Licensing exams and certification programs are also types of job-knowledge tests. Passing such exams indicates competence in the exam's subject area. Tests must be representative of the tested field, otherwise, litigation can be brought against the test-giver.

Situational judgment tests 

Situational judgment tests are commonly used as employee-selection and employee-screening tools and have been developed to predict employment success. These tests present realistic hypothetical scenarios in a multiple-choice format. Applicants are asked to state what they would do in a difficult job-related situation.

Situational judgment tests measure the suitability of job applicants by assessing attributes such as problem solving, service orientation, and striving for achievement.

See also 
 Civil Rights Act of 1964
 Industrial and organizational psychology
 Objective test
 Projective test
 Psychological testing
 Situational judgement test
 Watson v. Fort Worth Bank & Trust, 487 U.S. 977 (1988)
 Wards Cove Packing Co. v. Atonio, 490 U.S. 642, 657 (1989),

References 

Human resource management
Psychological testing
Labour law
Industrial and organizational psychology